Robert Hoff was an American football player and coach. He was a three-time letter letterwinner at the University of Iowa from 1948 to 1950, starring as an end. He served as the head football coach at Iowa City High School in Iowa City, Iowa (c. 1954) and at the University of Central Missouri (then Warrensburg Teachers College) for one season in 1961. He also served as an assistant varsity line coach at the United States Coast Guard Academy under head coach Otto Graham.

Head coaching record

College

References

Year of birth missing
Year of death missing
American football ends
Central Missouri Mules football coaches
Coast Guard Bears football coaches
Iowa Hawkeyes football players
High school football coaches in Iowa
People from Cedar Rapids, Iowa
Players of American football from Iowa